The Yokosuka K4Y (or Navy Type 90 Seaplane Trainer) was a Japanese floatplane trainer of the 1930s.  A single engined two-seat biplane, 211 K4Ys were built between 1933 and 1940, serving as the Imperial Japanese Navy's basic floatplane trainer throughout the Second World War.

Development and design
In 1930, the Imperial Japanese Navy Air Service's basic seaplane trainer was the Yokosuka K1Y or Type 13 Seaplane Trainer, which had been in use from 1925, and it instructed the First Naval Air Technical Arsenal based at Yokosuka to design a replacement. The design team, led by Jiro Saha and Tamefumi Suzuki designed a single-bay biplane with a welded steel-tube fuselage and wooden wings, it being the first Japanese designed aircraft with such a fuselage.

Yokosuka built two prototypes, powered by 90 hp (67 kW) Hatakaze four-cylinder air-cooled inline engines in 1930, flying in 1930, and after successful testing, a version powered by a 130 hp Gasuden Jimpu radial engine was ordered into production as the Navy Type 90 Seaplane trainer, with the short designation K4Y1.

Operational history
Production began at Watanabe in May 1933, Watanabe building 156 by 1939, with production then transferring to Nippon Hikoki who built a further 53 in 1939–40.

The K4Y1 started to replace the K1Y from 1933, remaining the Imperial Japanese Navy Air Service's principal basic seaplane trainer throughout the Pacific war. A few aircraft were released for civilian use.

Units using this aircraft

Imperial Japanese Navy Air Service

Specifications (K4Y1 seaplane)

References
Notes

Bibliography

 
 

World War II Japanese trainer aircraft
K04Y, Yokosuka
Floatplanes
K4Y
Biplanes
Single-engined tractor aircraft